Ashikawa is a Japanese surname. Notable people with the surname include:

, Japanese actress
, Japanese composer and producer
, Japanese artistic gymnast
, Japanese actress and singer

Japanese-language surnames